Climatology (from Greek , klima, "place, zone"; and , -logia) or climate science is the scientific study of Earth's climate, typically defined as weather conditions averaged over a period of at least 30 years. This modern field of study is regarded as a branch of the atmospheric sciences and a subfield of physical geography, which is one of the Earth sciences. Climatology now includes aspects of oceanography and biogeochemistry.

The main methods employed by climatologists are the analysis of observations and modelling of the physical processes that determine the climate. The main topics of research are the study of climate variability, mechanisms of climate changes and modern climate change. Basic knowledge of climate can be used within shorter term weather forecasting, for instance about climatic cycles such as the El Niño–Southern Oscillation (ENSO), the Madden–Julian oscillation (MJO), the North Atlantic oscillation (NAO), the Arctic oscillation (AO), the Pacific decadal oscillation (PDO), and the Interdecadal Pacific Oscillation (IPO).

Climate models are used for a variety of purposes from study of the dynamics of the weather and climate system to projections of future climate. Weather is known as the condition of the atmosphere over a period of time, while climate has to do with the atmospheric condition over an extended to indefinite period of time.

History 

The Greeks  began the formal study of climate; in fact the word climate is derived from the Greek word klima, meaning "slope," referring to the slope or inclination of the Earth's axis. Arguably the most influential classic text on climate was On Airs, Water and Places written by Hippocrates around 400 BCE. This work commented on the effect of climate on human health and cultural differences between Asia and Europe. This idea that climate controls which countries excel depending on their climate, or climatic determinism, remained influential throughout history.  Chinese scientist Shen Kuo (1031–1095) inferred that climates naturally shifted over an enormous span of time, after observing petrified bamboos found underground near Yanzhou (modern day Yan'an, Shaanxi province), a dry-climate area unsuitable for the growth of bamboo.

The invention of the thermometer and the barometer during the Scientific Revolution allowed for systematic recordkeeping, that began as early as 1640–1642 in England. Early climate researchers include Edmund Halley, who published a map of the trade winds in 1686 after a voyage to the southern hemisphere.  Benjamin Franklin (1706–1790) first mapped the course of the Gulf Stream for use in sending mail from the United States to Europe. Francis Galton (1822–1911) invented the term anticyclone.  Helmut Landsberg (1906–1985) fostered the use of statistical analysis in climatology, which led to its evolution into a physical science.

In the early 20th century, climatology was mostly focused on the description of regional climates. This descriptive climatology was mainly an applied science, giving farmers and other interested people statistics about what the normal weather was and how big chances were of extreme events. To do this, climatologists had to define a climate normal, or an average of weather and weather extremes over a period of typically 30 years.

Around the middle of the 20th century, many assumptions in meteorology and climatology considered climate to be roughly constant. While scientists knew of past climate change such as the ice ages, the concept of climate as unchanging was useful in the development of a general theory of what determines climate. This started to change in the decades that followed, and while the history of climate change science started earlier, climate change only became one of the main topics of study for climatologists in the seventies and onward.

Subfields 

Various subfields of climatology study different aspects of the climate. There are different categorizations of the fields in climatology. The American Meteorological Society for instance identifies descriptive climatology, scientific climatology and applied climatology as the three subcategories of climatology, a categorization based on the complexity and the purpose of the research. Applied climatologists apply their expertise to different industries such as manufacturing and agriculture.

Paleoclimatology seeks to reconstruct and understand past climates by examining records such as ice cores and tree rings (dendroclimatology). Paleotempestology uses these same records to help determine hurricane frequency over millennia.  Historical climatology is the study of climate as related to human history and thus focuses only on the last few thousand years.

Boundary-layer climatology is preoccupied with exchanges in water, energy and momentum near the surface. Further identified subfields are physical climatology, dynamic climatology, tornado climatology, regional climatology, bioclimatology, and synoptic climatology. The study of the hydrological cycle over long time scales is sometimes called hydroclimatology, in particular when studying the effects of climate change on the water cycle.

Methods 
The study of contemporary climates incorporates meteorological data accumulated over many years, such as records of rainfall, temperature and atmospheric composition. Knowledge of the atmosphere and its dynamics is also embodied in models, either statistical or mathematical, which help by integrating different observations and testing how they fit together. Modeling is used for understanding past, present and potential future climates.

Climate research is made difficult by the large scale, long time periods, and complex processes which govern climate. Climate is governed by physical laws which can be expressed as differential equations. These equations are coupled and nonlinear, so that approximate solutions are obtained by using numerical methods to create global climate models. Climate is sometimes modeled as a stochastic process but this is generally accepted as an approximation to processes that are otherwise too complicated to analyze.

Climate data 
The collection of long record of climate variables is essential for the study of climate. Climatology deals with the aggregate data that meteorology has collected. Scientists use both direct and indirect observations of the climate, from Earth observing satellites and scientific instrumentation such as a global network of thermometers, to prehistoric ice extracted from glaciers. As measuring technology changes over time, records of data cannot be compared directly. As cities are generally warmer than the surrounding areas, urbanization has made it necessary to constantly correct data for this urban heat island effect.

Models 

Climate models use quantitative methods to simulate the interactions of the atmosphere, oceans, land surface, and ice.  They are used for a variety of purposes from study of the dynamics of the weather and climate system to projections of future climate.  All climate models balance, or very nearly balance, incoming energy as short wave (including visible) electromagnetic radiation to the earth with outgoing energy as long wave (infrared) electromagnetic radiation from the earth. Any unbalance results in a change in the average temperature of the earth. Most climate models include the radiative effects of greenhouse gases such as carbon dioxide. These models predict an upward trend in the surface temperatures, as well as a more rapid increase in temperature at higher latitudes.

Models can range from relatively simple to complex:

 A simple radiant heat transfer model that treats the earth as a single point and averages outgoing energy
 this can be expanded vertically (radiative-convective models), or horizontally
 Coupled atmosphere–ocean–sea ice global climate models discretise and solve the full equations for mass and energy transfer and radiant exchange.
 Earth system models further include the biosphere.

Additionally, they are available on different resolutions ranging from >100 km to 1 km. High resolutions in global climate models are computational very demanding and only few global datasets exists. Examples are ICON  or mechanistically downscaled data such as CHELSA (Climatologies at high resolution for the earth's land surface areas).

Topics of research 
Topics that climatologists study fall roughly into three categories: climate variability, mechanisms of climatic change and modern climate change.

Climatological processes 
Various factors impact the average state of the atmosphere at a particular location. For instance, midlatitudes will have a pronounced seasonal cycle in temperature whereas tropical regions show little variation in temperature over the year. Another major control in climate is continentality: the distance to major water bodies such as oceans. Oceans act as a moderating factor, so that land close to it has typically mild winters and moderate summers. The atmosphere interacts with other spheres of the climate system, with winds generating ocean currents that transport heat around the globe.

Climate classification 
Classification is an important aspect of many sciences as a tool of simplifying complicated processes. Different climate classifications have been developed over the centuries, with the first ones in Ancient Greece. How climates are classified depends on what the application is. A wind energy producer will require different information (wind) in the classification than somebody interested in agriculture, for who precipitation and temperature are more important. The most widely used classification, the Köppen climate classification, was developed in the late nineteenth century and is based on vegetation. It uses monthly temperature and precipitation data.

Climate variability 

There are different modes of variability: recurring patterns of temperature or other climate variables. They are quantified with different indices. Much in the way the Dow Jones Industrial Average, which is based on the stock prices of 30 companies, is used to represent the fluctuations in the stock market as a whole, climate indices are used to represent the essential elements of climate. Climate indices are generally devised with the twin objectives of simplicity and completeness, and each index typically represents the status and timing of the climate factor it represents. By their very nature, indices are simple, and combine many details into a generalized, overall description of the atmosphere or ocean which can be used to characterize the factors which impact the global climate system.

El Niño–Southern Oscillation (ENSO) is a coupled ocean-atmosphere phenomenon in the Pacific Ocean responsible for most of the global variability in temperature, and has a cycle between two and seven years. The North Atlantic oscillation is a mode of variability that is mainly contained to the lower atmosphere, the troposphere. The layer of atmosphere above, the stratosphere is also capable of creating its own variability, most importantly in the Madden–Julian oscillation (MJO), which has a cycle of approximately 30 to 60 days. The Interdecadal Pacific oscillation can create changes in the Pacific Ocean and lower atmosphere on decadal time scales.

Climate change 
Climate change occurs when changes in Earth's climate system result in new weather patterns that remain in place for an extended period of time. This length of time can be as short as a few decades to as long as millions of years. The climate system receives nearly all of its energy from the sun. The climate system also gives off energy to outer space. The balance of incoming and outgoing energy, and the passage of the energy through the climate system, determines Earth's energy budget. When the incoming energy is greater than the outgoing energy, earth's energy budget is positive and the climate system is warming. If more energy goes out, the energy budget is negative and earth experiences cooling.  Climate change also influences the average sea level.

Modern climate change is driven by the human emissions of greenhouse gas from the burning of fossil fuel driving up global mean surface temperatures. Rising temperatures are only one aspect of modern climate change though, with includes observed changes in precipitation, storm tracks and cloudiness. Warmer temperatures are driving further changes in the climate system, such as the widespread melt of glaciers, sea level rise and shifts in flora and fauna.

Differences with meteorology 
In contrast to meteorology, which focuses on short term weather systems lasting up to a few weeks, climatology studies the frequency and trends of those systems. It studies the periodicity of weather events over years to millennia, as well as changes in long-term average weather patterns, in relation to atmospheric conditions. Climatologists study both the nature of climates – local, regional or global – and the natural or human-induced factors that cause climates to change. Climatology considers the past and can help predict future climate change.

Phenomena of climatological interest include the atmospheric boundary layer, circulation patterns, heat transfer (radiative, convective and latent), interactions between the atmosphere and the oceans and land surface (particularly vegetation, land use and topography), and the chemical and physical composition of the atmosphere.

Use in weather forecasting 

A more complicated way of making a forecast, the analog technique requires remembering a previous weather event which is expected to be mimicked by an upcoming event.  What makes it a difficult technique to use is that there is rarely a perfect analog for an event in the future.  Some call this type of forecasting pattern recognition, which remains a useful method of observing rainfall over data voids such as oceans with knowledge of how satellite imagery relates to precipitation rates over land, as well as the forecasting of precipitation amounts and distribution in the future.  A variation on this theme is used in medium range forecasting, which is known as teleconnections, when systems in other locations are used to help pin down the location of a system within the surrounding regime.  One method of using teleconnections are by using climate indices such as ENSO-related phenomena.

See also 

 Biogeochemistry
 Climate as complex networks
 Climatic geomorphology
 Climate reanalysis
 Geophysics
 Tropical cyclone rainfall climatology
 Urban climatology
 List of climate scientists
 List of women climate scientists and activists

References

Books

Further reading
 Jenny Uglow, "What the Weather Is" (review of Sarah Dry, Waters of the World: The Story of the Scientists Who Unraveled the Mysteries of Our Oceans, Atmosphere, and Ice Sheets and Made the Planet Whole, University of Chicago Press, 2019, 332 pp.), The New York Review of Books, vol. LXVI, no. 20 (19 December 2019), pp. 56–58.

External links 

 Climate Science Special Report – U.S. Global Change Research Program
 KNMI Climate Explorer The Royal Netherlands Meteorological Institute's Climate Explorer graphs climatological relationships of spatial and temporal data.
 Climatology as a Profession Amer. Inst. of Physics account of the history of the discipline of climatology in the 20th century

 
Atmospheric sciences
Climate and weather statistics
Natural environment